Charles Hawkins (1834 or 1835 -  February 29, 1908) was a Seaman in the Union Navy during the American Civil War, where he was awarded the Civil War Congressional Medal of Honor. Hawkins was born in either 1834 or 1835, depending on the source, in Scotland. He lived in Portsmouth, New Hampshire, and enlisted in the Union Navy from New Hampshire. He served on board the USS Agawam, as one of a volunteer crew of a powderboat. He was given his Medal of Honor on December 23, 1864, when his boat exploded on that date near Fort Fisher. Hawkins was awarded his Medal of Honor on December 31, 1864. He died on February 29, 1908, in Rhode Island. He was buried in Saint Mary Cemetery in West Warwick, Rhode Island.

See also
First Battle of Fort Fisher

Notes

References

External links
 
 Naval History and Heritage Command: Agawam I (Side Wheel Gunboat)

Union Navy sailors
United States Navy Medal of Honor recipients
American Civil War recipients of the Medal of Honor
1830s births
1908 deaths
Scottish emigrants to the United States
Scottish-born Medal of Honor recipients
People from Portsmouth, New Hampshire